In mathematics, the monster Lie algebra is an infinite-dimensional generalized Kac–Moody algebra acted on by the monster group, which was used to prove the monstrous moonshine conjectures.

Structure 
The monster Lie algebra m is a Z2-graded Lie algebra. The piece of degree (m, n) has dimension cmn if (m, n) ≠ (0, 0) and dimension 2 if (m, n) = (0, 0). 
The integers cn are the coefficients of qn of the  j-invariant as elliptic modular function

The Cartan subalgebra is the 2-dimensional subspace of degree (0, 0), so the monster Lie algebra has rank 2.

The monster Lie algebra has just one real simple root, given by the vector (1, −1), and the Weyl group has order 2, and acts by mapping (m, n) to (n, m). The imaginary simple roots are the vectors (1, n) for n = 1, 2, 3, ..., and they have multiplicities cn.

The denominator formula for the monster Lie algebra is the product formula for the j-invariant:

The denominator formula (sometimes called the Koike-Norton-Zagier infinite product identity) was discovered in the 1980s. Several mathematicians, including Masao Koike, Simon P. Norton, and Don Zagier, independently made the discovery.

Construction 

There are two ways to construct the monster Lie algebra. As it is a generalized Kac–Moody algebra whose simple roots are known, it can be defined by explicit generators and relations; however, this presentation does not give an action of the monster group on it.

It can also be constructed from the monster vertex algebra by using the Goddard–Thorn theorem of string theory. This construction is much harder, but also proves that the monster group acts naturally on it.

References 

 
; 
 
 (Introductory study text with a brief account of Borcherds algebra in Ch. 21)

Lie algebras
Moonshine theory